Ou Mal is a khum (commune) of Battambang District in Battambang Province in north-western Cambodia.

Villages

 Ou Mal
 Dak Sasar
 Sala Balat
 Prey Dach
 Kouk Ponley
 Voat Roka
 Koun Sek
 Andoung Pring
 Boeng Reang
 Prey Roka

References

Communes of Battambang province
Battambang District